The 2013 Sultan of Johor Cup was the third edition of the Sultan of Johor Cup. It was held in Johor Bahru, Johor, Malaysia from 22 to 29 September 2013.

The number of teams for this year's cup is the same compared to the previous tournament where six teams competed.

India defeated Malaysia 3–0 in the final match to win the cup.

Participating nations
Six countries are participating in this year's tournament:

 (Host)

Results
All times are in Malaysia Standard Time (UTC+08:00).

Pool

Classification round

Fifth and sixth place

Third and fourth place

Final

Final standings

References

External links
Official website

Sultan of Johor Cup
Sultan of Johor Cup
Sultan of Johor Cup
Sultan of Johor Cup
Sultan of Johor Cup